Peter Struycken (born 5 January 1939 in The Hague) is a Dutch artist, and the brother of actor Carel Struycken. He won the 2012 Heineken Prize for Arts from the Royal Netherlands Academy of Arts and Sciences.

References

External links
Peter Struycken Website

1939 births
Living people
Dutch contemporary artists
Artists from The Hague
Royal Academy of Art, The Hague alumni
Dutch stamp designers
Winners of the Heineken Prize